"Hey There Sister" is a song by Belgian singer-songwriter Tom Dice, featuring vocals from Lize Feryn. The song was released as a digital download in Belgium on 16 September 2016 through Universal Music Belgium as the second single from his third studio album I've Come a Long Way (2016). The song was written by Tom Eeckhout and produced by Andy Burrows.

Music video
A music video to accompany the release of "Hey There Sister" was first released onto YouTube on 7 October 2016 at a total length of three minutes and twenty-nine seconds.

Track listing

Chart performance

Weekly charts

Release history

References

Tom Dice songs
2016 singles
2016 songs
Songs written by Tom Dice